Samuel James Cook (born 4 August 1997) is an English cricketer. He made his first-class debut on 31 March 2016 for Loughborough MCCU against Surrey as part of the Marylebone Cricket Club University fixtures. He played for Essex against the West Indies during their tour of England in August 2017. He was part of the 2017 County Championship winning Essex squad.

He made his List A debut for Essex in the 2018 Royal London One-Day Cup on 17 May 2018. He made his Twenty20 debut for Essex in the 2018 T20 Blast on 4 July 2018. In September 2020, in the final of the 2020 Bob Willis Trophy, Cook took a five-wicket haul. In April 2022, he was bought by the Trent Rockets for the 2022 season of The Hundred.

Personal life
He grew up in Chelmsford, Essex and attended Barnes Farm Junior School, Great Baddow High School and Loughborough University. Cook is a supporter of Manchester United F.C.

References

External links
 

1997 births
Living people
English cricketers
Essex cricketers
Loughborough MCCU cricketers
Sportspeople from Chelmsford
Marylebone Cricket Club cricketers
Trent Rockets cricketers
Alumni of Loughborough University